Villa Tulumba is a town in Córdoba Province, Argentina. It is the head town of the Tulumba Department.

External links

 Municipal website

Populated places in Córdoba Province, Argentina